The Diocese of Cork, Cloyne and Ross, also referred to as the United Diocese of Cork, Cloyne and Ross, is a diocese in the Church of Ireland. The diocese is in the ecclesiastical province of Dublin.  It is the see of the Bishop of Cork, Cloyne and Ross, the result of a combination of the bishoprics of Cork and Cloyne and Ross in 1583, the separation of Cork and Ross and Cloyne in 1660, and the re-combination of Cork and Ross and Cloyne in 1835.

History of the Diocese of Cork

The Diocese of Cork was one of the twenty-four dioceses established at the Synod of Rathbreasail (1111 AD) on an ancient bishopric founded by Saint Finbarr in 876. On 30 July 1326, Pope John XXII, on the petition of King Edward II of England, issued a papal bull for the union of the bishoprics of Cork and Cloyne, the union to take effect on the death of either bishop. The union should have taken effect on the death of Philip of Slane in 1327, however, bishops were still appointed to each separate bishopric. The union eventually took place with Jordan Purcell appointed bishop of the united see of Cork and Cloyne in 1429. Following the Reformation, the diocese was again split and from 1583, Ross and Cork shared a bishop. In 1835 Cloyne was merged with "Ross and Cork".

History of the Diocese of Cloyne

The diocese of Cloyne has its origins in the monastic settlement founded by St Colman in the 6th century. Cloyne was not one of the dioceses established at the Synod of Rathbreasail, but a bishop of Cloyne was ruling the diocese by 1148, which was recognized at the Synod of Kells in March 1152. The see was merged with Cork to form the Diocese of Cork and Cloyne in 1429.

History of the Diocese of Ross

This see was founded by St. Fachtna, and the place-name was variously known as Roscairbre (Rosscarbery) and Rosailithir (Ross of the pilgrims). St. Fachtna founded the School of Ross as well as the see; and his death occurred about 590, on 14 August, on which day his feast is celebrated. At that time the chiefs of the tuath were the O'Leary, known as Uí Laoghaire Ruis Ó gCairbre. By 1160, Ross (distinct from the Scottish Diocese of Ross) was an independent bishopric. In 1207, the Norman King, John of England, granted the cantred of Rosailithir to David Roche, regardless of the claims of the native chief, the O'Driscoll, but the episcopal manors were left undisturbed. In 1306, the value of the bishop's mensa was 26 marks, while the cathedral was valued at 3 marks; and the tribal revenue of the see was but 45 pounds sterling. The number of parishes was 29, divided into 3 divisions; and there was a Cistercian abbey, Carrigilihy (de fonte vivo); also a Benedictine Priory at St. Mary's, Ross. The Franciscans acquired a foundation at Sherkin Island from the O'Driscolls in 1460.

Blessed Thady MacCarthy was appointed Bishop of Ross in 1482, but was forcibly deprived of his see in 1488. However, he was translated to the united bishopric of Cork and Cloyne in 1490; was again a victim of political intrigues, and died a confessor at Ivrea in 1492, being beatified in 1895. In 1517 the revenue of the diocese was but 60 marks. At that date the chapter was complete with 12 canons and 4 vicars, and there were 27 parishes, including three around Berehaven.
Following the Reformation, the merged dioceses of "Cork and Cloyne" were again split with Ross and Cork sharing a bishop from 1583 onwards.

Cathedrals
 Saint Finbarre's Cathedral, Cork city, Cork.
 Cathedral Church of St. Fachtna, Rosscarbery, Ross.
 St. Coleman's Cathedral, Cloyne.

Parishes

Diocese of Cork
The Diocese of Cork comprises 14 parishes with 40 churches (excluding the cathedral)

Aghadown, St Matthew's Church, Aghadown - parish of Ballydehob
Ballydehob, St Matthias - parish of Ballydehob
Ballinadee - parish of Ballymodan
Ballymartle - parish of Kinsale
Ballymodan, St Peter's Church, Ballymodan - parish of Ballymodan
Beara, St Peter - parish of Kilmocomogue
Blackrock St Michael, St Michael - parish of Douglas
Brinny Church - parish of Ballymodan
Carrigaline, St Mary - parish of Carriglaine
Carrigrohane, St Peter - parish of Carrigrohane
Cork, St Anne Shandon
Crookhaven, St Brendan - parish of Kilmoe
Desertserges - parish of Kinneigh
Douglas, St Luke - parish of Douglas
Drimoleague, St Matthew - parish of Fanlobbus
Drinagh, Christ Church - parish of Fanlobbus
Dunmanway St Edmund - parish of Fanlobbus
Durrus, St James the Apostle - parish of Kilmocomogue
Garrycloyne - parish of Carrigrohane
Fanlobbus, St Mary - parish of Fanlobbus
Frankfield, Holy Trinity - parish of Douglas
Inniscarra, Senan - parish of Carrigrohane
Innishannon, Christ Church - parish of Ballymodan
Kilbonane, St Mark - parish of Moviddy
Kilmeen, Christ Church - parish of Kinneigh
Kilmocomogue
Kilmurry, St Andrew - parish of Moviddy
Kinneigh, St Bartholomew - parish of Kinneigh
Kinsale, Church of St Multose - parish of Kinsale
Marmullane, St Mary - parish of Douglas
Monkstown, St John - parish of Carriglaine
Murragh, St Patrick - parish of Kinneigh
Nohoval - parish of Templebreedy
Rathclaren - parish of Ballymodan
Schull, Holy Trinity - parish of Kilmoe
Teampol-Na-Mbocht - parish of Kilmoe
Templemartin, St Martin - parish of Moviddy
Templetrine - parish of Kinsale
Templebreedy, Holy Trinity
University College Cork

Diocese of Cloyne
The Diocese of Cloyne comprises 5 parishes with 19 churches.

Ardmore - parish of Youghal
Ardnageehy, Mary - parish of Fermoy
Ballyhooly, Christ Church - parish of Fermoy
Brigown, St George - parish of Fermoy
Castlemartyr, St Anne - parish of Youghal
Castletownroche - parish of Mallow
Cloyne, St Colman's Cathedral - parish of Cloyne
Cobh & Glanmire - parish of Cobh & Glanmire Union
Corkbeg, St Michael & All Angels - parish of Cloyne
Doneraile, St Mary - parish of Mallow
Fermoy, Christ Church - parish of Fermoy
Gurranekennefeake, Holy Trinity - parish of Cloyne
Knockmourne, St Luke - parish of Fermoy
Little Island, St Lappan - parish of Cobh & Glanmire Union
Mallow, St James - parish of Mallow
Midleton, St John the Baptist- parish of Cloyne
Rathcooney - parish of Cobh & Glanmire Union
Rushbrooke, Christ Church - parish of Cobh & Glanmire Union
Youghal, St Mary - parish of Youghal

Diocese of Ross
The Diocese of Ross comprises 3 parishes with 13 churches.

Abbeystrewry - parish of Abbeystrewry
Caheragh, St Mary - parish of Abbeystrewry
Castlehaven - parish of Abbeystrewry
Castleventry - parish of Ross
Courtmacsherry, St John the Evangelist - parish of Kilgariffe
Kilfaughnabeg, Christ Church - parish of Ross
Kilgariffe - parish of Kilgariffe
Kilmacabea - parish of Ross
Kilmalooda, All Saints' Church - parish of Kilgariffe
Myross - parish of Ross
Rosscarbery, St Fachtna's Cathedral - parish of Ross
Timoleague,  The Ascension - parish of Kilgariffe
Tullagh, St Matthew - parish of Abbeystrewry

Bishops

Education and Faith Development
There are a number Church of Ireland primary and secondary schools in the diocese, with the Bishop as the patron. There is also a Children's ministry which organizes events outside of the school system. Developing from the Bishop's Course in Theology, recently the Certificate in Christian Studies (validated by St. Patrick's College, Maynooth) has been delivered in the Diocese.

See also

 List of Anglican dioceses in the United Kingdom and Ireland
 Diocese of Cork
 Diocese of Ross (Ireland)
 Diocese of Ross (Scotland)
 Roman Catholic Diocese of Cloyne
 Archdeacon of Cork
 Archdeacon of Cloyne
 Archdeacon of Ross

References

External links
Diocesan Website

 
Cork, Cloyne
Religion in County Cork
Church of Ireland in the Republic of Ireland